The 1974 NCAA Division I men's lacrosse tournament was the 4th annual Division I NCAA Men's Lacrosse Championship tournament. Eight NCAA Division I college men's lacrosse teams met after having played their way through a regular season, and for some, a conference tournament. The championship game was hosted by Rutgers University, and was played in front of 7,728 fans.

Overview 
Johns Hopkins, in the national championship game for the third straight year, defeated defending champion and number one ranked Maryland 17 to 12 to win the 1974 Title. This game saw Johns Hopkins University, 12 and 2 for the season and led by legendary coach Bob Scott and Hall of Fame attackman Jack Thomas, defeat University of Maryland, led by Hall of Famer Frank Urso.

This was the 7th Johns Hopkins team that Scott had directed to part or all of a national title dating back to prior to the start of NCAA participation in the lacrosse championship playoffs. Scott retired as head coach following this game to become Athletic Director.  All American Franz Wittlesberger scored five goals in the final. Hopkins' senior defenseman Bob Barbera scored the only goal of his career in the championship game.

This tournament is also notable for the Johns Hopkins versus Washington and Lee semifinal game won by Hopkins in a close 11 to 10 matchup. Trailing 10 to 7 in the fourth quarter, Hopkins scored four straight goals, including the game winner with two minutes left, to overcome previously unbeaten Washington and Lee. Rich Kowalchuk scored on a feed from Tom Myrick for the game-winning goal with 1:50 to play in the fourth quarter. Hopkins outshot Washington and Lee 21 to 5 in the 4th quarter.

Washington and Lee which finished the season 15 and 1, was coming off their second straight undefeated regular season and had defeated Navy twice, Princeton, Duke, North Carolina, and Virginia before losing to Hopkins. Jack Emmer, who had previously led Cortland State to a tournament appearance coached the Generals to six straight NCAA tournaments from 1973 to 1978.

Bracket

Box scores

Finals

Semi-finals

Quarterfinals

Outstanding players

Franz Wittlesberger, Johns Hopkins, 15 points, leading tournament scorer

 The NCAA did not designate a Most Outstanding Player until the 1977 national tournament.  The Tournament outstanding player is listed here as the tournament leading scorer.

See also
1974 NCAA Division II Lacrosse Championship

References 

NCAA Division I Men's Lacrosse Championship
NCAA Division I Men's Lacrosse Championship
NCAA Division I Men's Lacrosse Championship
NCAA Division I Men's Lacrosse Championship
NCAA Division I Men's Lacrosse Championship